Agastheesvarar Temple, Purisai is a Siva temple in Purisai in Tiruvannamalai district in Tamil Nadu (India).

Vaippu Sthalam
It is one of the shrines of the Vaippu Sthalams sung by Tamil Saivite Nayanar Sundarar.

Presiding deity
The presiding deity is Agastheesvarar. The Goddess is known as Akilandesvari.

Location
This temple is located between Vandavasi and  Cheyyar. There is also another Purisai near Thakkolam.

References

Shiva temples in Tiruvannamalai district